The Dawn is a 1936 film made in the Irish Free State, directed, produced and written by Tom Cooper. Set during the Irish War of Independence, it was the first indigenous sound production made in Ireland. It was released in the United States under the title Dawn Over Ireland.

Production

The Dawn was filmed by Killarney garage owner Tom Cooper in 1934 and 1935. The cast comprised 250 amateur actors from the local area, many of them Irish Republican Army veterans.

Plot
In 1866, in the runup to the Fenian Rising, Brian Malone was falsely denounced as an informer. In 1919, his grandson of the same name aims to clear the family name by serving in the IRA.

Reception

The Irish Times correspondent wrote, "The Dawn, in spite of various crudities, is as thrilling a show as ever I want to witness, and its amateur cast gives it a freshness which is all too rare." It was contrasted with Ourselves Alone, which had portrayed "clean-limbed police" with the IRA men shown as "tough hombres"; The Dawn, on the other hand, depicted the Black and Tans as "too scoundrelly for words" and was liable to make Unionist viewers squirm.

Cooper received an award from Cork Film Festival in the late 1970s.

An original 35 mm print is stored in the British Film Institute; it was digitised and restored in 2016. Prints are also held by RTÉ and the Irish Film Institute.

References

External links

1936 films
English-language Irish films
Irish War of Independence films
Films set in Ireland
Irish black-and-white films
Irish drama films
1936 drama films
1930s English-language films